The 1902–03 St Helens R.F.C. season was the club's eighth as members of the Northern Rugby Football Union, the 29th in their history. This season, the Northern Rugby Football Union split into two divisions for the first time. St Helens were placed in Division 1,but were relegated after finishing in a second-bottom 12th place. In the Challenge Cup, St Helens were beaten in the second round by Rochdale Hornets.

NRFU Division 1

References

St Helens R.F.C. seasons
1902 in English rugby league
1903 in English rugby league